is a term for two systems of government welfare programs employed in Japan:  and . Unemployment insurance is managed by Hello Work; and worker's accident compensation insurance is managed by the Labour Standards Office.

References

Types of insurance